Kamino may refer to:

Kamino, personal name of Emperor Saga (785–842), emperor of Japan
Kamino bodies, eosinophilic globoids
Kamino (rural locality), a  village in Zharkovsky District of Tver Oblast, Russia
Kamino (Star Wars), a fictional planet in the Star Wars franchise

People with the surname
, Japanese speed skater

See also
Camino (disambiguation)
Comino (disambiguation)
Kamina (disambiguation)
Kamini (disambiguation)

Japanese-language surnames